The Indian Institute of Petroleum (IIP), established in 1960, is one of the 37 constituent laboratories of the Council of Scientific and Industrial Research (CSIR), dedicated to  R&D in  the hydrocarbon sector.

The Director General of CSIR based in Delhi, Dr. Nallathamy Kalaiselvi, is the head of the parent organization.  Dr. Anjan Ray has been the Director of the institute since November 2016.

Established through an act of parliament in the year 1959, it started in New Delhi in 1960 and finally in Dehradun since 1963. It sought organisational help from Institut français du pétrole (IFP), France, a petroleum research organisation, under UNESCO programme during 1960 to 1964.

An ISO 9001 certified institute, IIP develops processes and products for petroleum refining and petrochemical industries, training of personnel in oil and petrochemical industries, and assisting in formulation of standards for petroleum products. The institute acquired the ISO 9001 certification in 1998.

The Institute has a sanctioned research staff strength of 120 R&D scientists supported by 224 technical personnel and 213 administrative staff. It is equipped with state of the art R&D facilities including pilot plants. The annual budget of the institute is around INR 100 crores (USD 12 Million). The institute is recognized by over 14 universities to conduct research leading to Doctorate degree.

Research programs
Applied research leading to the development of technologies, products and processes in the area of Petroleum refining, Petrochemicals, Speciality chemicals, IC engines, and Combustion.

Expertise
Process and product development (lab/bench/pilot scale)
Process scale-up, process design
Process optimization
Process improvement and revamping
Techno-economic feasibility studies
Technology assessment
Energy audit and conservation in chemical plants
Vehicular pollution abatement
Use of alternative fuels in IC engines
Product characterisation

Activities
Petroleum Refining and catalysis
Catalytic refining and catalysis
Catalyst for refining process
Separation process, solvent extraction, adsorption, membranes
Lubricating oil base stocks processes, evaluation and characterisation
Modified bitumen and carbon materials
Thermal conversion process
Modeling and simulation
Chemical/petrochemicals intermediates
Additives for petrochemicals industry
Process and product development for specialty chemicals
Petrochemicals intermediates
Bioprocessing of petroleum streams
Fuel lubes and chemicals from biomass

Petroleum Products Application
Engine emission: pollution abatements
Alternative fuels: oxygenates, CNG, Propane, LPG, DME
Engine development: improved efficiency, lower emission
Tribology: evaluation and development of petroleum products, and developments of techniques for product evaluation
Combustion: developments of industrial and domestic combustion appliances, evaluation of fire resistant properties of hydraulic fluids

Analytical sciences
Detailed and short evaluation of crude oil
Characterisation of petroleum products
Characterisation of catalyst
Technical and support services
Instrumental analysis
Engineering services
Pipeline Design and Network
Training
Business developments and technology transfer

Awards

CSIR Technology
Production of food grade hexane by using nmp technology 2001.
Lube oil base stock (lobs)  production through nmp 2000.
Propane deasphalting 1999.
Visbreaking technology   1998.
Sulfolane production technology  1997.
Business development and technology marketing 1996.
Low air pressure film burner 1994.
Food grade hexane 1993.
Bimetallic Pt-Re reforming catalyst 1992.
Production of benzene/toluene  through sulfolane extraction 1990.

Young Scientist
1990 Young Scientist.
1993 Federation of Indian Chambers of Commerce and Industry (ficci).
1993 Excellence in science and technology.
2021 Young Scientist

Indian Chemical Manufacturers Association (ICMA)
Production of benzene/toluene through sulfolane extraction 1985.

See also
University of Petroleum and Energy Studies
 Rajiv Gandhi Institute of Petroleum Technology

References

External links
Official website

Research institutes in Dehradun
Council of Scientific and Industrial Research
Research institutes established in 1960
Institutions of Petroleum in India
1960 establishments in Uttar Pradesh